was the twelfth of the fifty-three stations of the Tōkaidō. It is located in the present-day city of Numazu, Shizuoka Prefecture, Japan.

History
Numazu was the easternmost post station within Suruga Province, and was the castle town of the daimyō of Numazu Domain. During its peak in the Edo period, Numazu-juku had over 1,200 buildings, including three honjin, one sub-honjin, and 55 hatago. Modern Numazu city has a local history museum displaying the history of the area.

The classic ukiyo-e print by Andō Hiroshige (Hōeido edition) from 1831 to 1834 depicts travelers walking along a tree-lined river bank, towards Numazu-shuku, under a huge full moon in a deep blue sky. One of the travelers is wearing the white robes of a pilgrim, and is carrying a huge Tengu mask on his back, indicating that his destination is the famed Shinto shrine of Konpira on Shikoku.

Neighboring post towns
Tōkaidō
Mishima-shuku - Numazu-juku - Hara-juku

Further reading
Carey, Patrick. Rediscovering the Old Tokaido:In the Footsteps of Hiroshige. Global Books UK (2000). 
Chiba, Reiko. Hiroshige's Tokaido in Prints and Poetry. Tuttle. (1982) 
Taganau, Jilly. The Tokaido Road: Travelling and Representation in Edo and Meiji Japan. RoutledgeCurzon (2004).

References

Stations of the Tōkaidō
Stations of the Tōkaidō in Shizuoka Prefecture